Country Code: +690
International Call Prefix: 00

Landlines
The local telephone numbers in Tokelau are five digits long with no leading trunk zero.

The numbers were increased from four to five digits in November 2015 by prefixing '2' to the old numbers.

Subscriber numbers: +690   NXXX (where	N = 1 to 9 and X = 0 to 9)

Test numbers:
+690 3190 (ring tone only)
+690 5999 (answering machine)

References

Tokelau
Telecommunications in Tokelau
Tokelau communications-related lists